The most northern settlements on Earth are communities close to the North Pole, ranging from about 70° N to about 89° N. This is a list showing all of the northernmost settlements on Earth, which are all south of latitude 90° N. 

There are no permanent civilian settlements north of 79° N, the furthest north (78.55° N) being Ny-Ålesund, a permanent settlement of about 30 people on the Norwegian island of Svalbard. Just below this settlement at 78.12° N is Svalbard's primary city, Longyearbyen, which has a population of over 2,000.

When occupied for a few weeks some years, the northernmost temporary settlement in the world is Camp Barneo, a Russian tourist attraction located near 88°11'00" N. As of 2022, it had not been occupied since 2018.

The tables below shows the settlements, towns, and cities that are the northernmost in the world of their kind.

All locations

Cities and towns
This is a list of the northernmost cities and towns in the world.

Larger cities
Northernmost cities with more than 100,000 inhabitants. The population data may include municipalities, urban areas or metropolitan areas.

Northernmost cities with more than 250,000 inhabitants.

See also
Southernmost settlements
Extreme points of Earth
List of northernmost items
List of research stations in the Arctic

References

External links
Up Here Magazine, 'explore Canada's far north' 

 
Populated places of Arctic Russia
Lists by region
Extreme points of Earth
Northernmost settlement
Northernmost